Postplatyptilia vorbecki is a moth of the family Pterophoridae. It is known from Ecuador.

The wingspan is about 17 mm. Adults are on wing in September and October.

Etymology
The species is named after its collector, Mr Vorbeck.

References

vorbecki
Moths described in 2006